Satis cognitum is an encyclical of Pope Leo XIII dated 29 June 1896 on the unity of the Church, and some heresies of his time.

Content
"The pontificate of Leo marked a change in how popes exercised their teaching authority. With Leo, the popes begin to offer theological treatments on important topics. It also saw a beginning the Church's participation in ecumenism. 

The encyclical is an invitation to those who are without the Church to return to it. It is an affirmation of the Church's unity, and the role of the Magisterium in preserving that unity,<ref>{{cite book | url = https://books.google.com/books?id=GAlVCQAAQBAJ&pg=PA245& | last= Sakowski | first = Derek | title =The ecclesiological Reality of Reception: Considered as a solution to the debate over the ontological priority of the universal church, | publisher = Gregorian Biblical Book Shop | date= 2014 | page = 245 | isbn= 9788878392717}}</ref> through the threefold responsibilities of sanctifying, governing and teaching. 

The document contains an extensive articulation of and apologia for Catholic ecclesiology as it relates to the Church's unity, one of the four marks of the Church according to the Niceno-Constantinopolitan Creed, which professes belief in "one, holy, catholic, and apostolic Church." The purpose was to indicate Leo's desire for unity and his interest in Catholic Ecumenism.

In the second half of the text, Pope Leo strongly defends the primacy of the Roman Pontiff as taught at the First Vatican Council as a corollary of the Church's unity, but notes

The encyclical concludes with an appeal to non-Catholic Christians and others for reunion with the Catholic Church.

See also
 List of encyclicals of Pope Leo XIII
 Mortalium animos'' - Pius XI on the same subject

References

External links

Satis cognitum
Satis cognitum

Encyclicals of Pope Leo XIII
1896 in Christianity
1896 documents
June 1896 events